Saccocera is a genus of moths in the family Brachodidae.

Species
Saccocera miangkabau Kallies, 2013
Saccocera orpheus (Kallies, 2004)
Saccocera panaras Kallies, 2013
Saccocera sauteri (Kallies, 2004)

References

 , 2013: New and little known Brachodidae from tropical Asia and Papua New Guinea (Lepidoptera, Cossoidea). Zootaxa, 3641 (3): 241-259. Abstract: .

Brachodidae